Below is the list of painters from Indonesia or the Dutch Indies.

Native Indonesian Painters
 Affandi (1907–1990)
 Ahmad Sadali (1924–1987), painter and lecturer at the ITB-Bandung
 Anak Agung Gde Sobrat (1912–1992) 
 Basuki Abdullah (1915–1993)
 I Ketut Soki (b. 1946)
 Kartika Affandi-Koberl (b. 1934)
 Bing, Kho Khiem (b. 1907) born Malang, trained Brussels and Netherlands. Early modernist painter.
 I Nyoman Masriadi (b. 1973), Balinese artist and painter
 Ida Bagus Made (1915–1999), Balinese painter
 Marina Joesoef (b. 1959)
 Mochtar Apin (1923–1994)
 Mustofa Bisri (b. 1944), Islamic teacher, leader, poet and painter
 Raden Saleh (1811–1880)
 Srihadi Soedarsono (b.1931), painter and lecturer
 Sudjana Kerton (1922–1994)
 Tio Tjay (b. 1946)
 Umi Dachlan (1943–2009), painter and lecturer at the ITB-Bandung
 Yunizar (b. 1971)
 Popo Iskandar (1927-2000), Painter And Essayist
 Motchtar Apin (1923-1994), Abstract Painter 
 Abdul Djalil Pirous (b.1932), Painter And Lecture

Foreign-born Indonesian Painters

 Antonio Blanco (1912–1999), Philippine-born Indonesian painter
 Rudolf Bonnet (1895–1978), Dutch-born Indonesian painter
 Lee Man Fong (1913–1988), Chinese-born Indonesian painter
 Willem Hofker (1902–1981), Dutch-born Indonesian and Dutch painter
 Ernest Dezentje (1884–1972), Dutch-born Indonesian painter 
 Adrien-Jean Le Mayeur (1880–1958), Belgium-born Indonesian painter
 Ries Mulder (1909–1973), Dutch-born Indonesian painter and lecturer
 Arie Smit (1916–2016), Dutch-born Indonesian painter
 Han Snel (1925–1998), Dutch-born Indonesian painter
 Walter Spies (1895–1942), Russian-born Indonesian painter
 Symon (1947–2020), American-born Indonesian painter, aka Ronald Thomas Bierl

Indonesia
Painters